Between Two Worlds is the second novel in Upton Sinclair's Lanny Budd series. First published in 1941, the story covers the period from 1919 to 1929

Plot
This volume deals with the aftermath of World War I in Europe during the 1920s (with the Beer Hall Putsch, the Italian fascist regime and some of the important conferences) and later the Roaring Twenties.

After two disastrous affairs with married women Lanny marries in the end a rich heiress from New York, Irma. In the climax Lanny covers his father's stock market margin call on Black Thursday, Oct 24th 1929, then insists that his father sell all his stocks the next market day, thus escaping the carnage of Black Tuesday.  His efforts to save his wife's wealth were not quite as successful, and her uncle was wiped out.

Novels set in the 1920s
1941 American novels
American historical novels
Novels by Upton Sinclair